Earth & Sky is the third solo studio album by British singer-songwriter Graham Nash, released in February 1980 on Capitol Records.

Track listing

Personnel 

 Graham Nash – producer, vocals, electric piano (1), acoustic guitar (2, 3), rhythm guitar (4, 6), organ (5), string arrangements (5), electric guitar (9), harmonica (9), string writing (9)
 Craig Doerge – acoustic piano (1, 5, 8-10), electric piano (2, 3 ,7, 8), organ (6, 8, 10), string arrangements (5), string writing (9)
 David Lindley – rhythm guitar (1), Hawaiian guitar (3), lead guitar (4, 6), guitars (10)
 Joe Walsh – lead guitar (1, 5), rhythm guitar (1)
 Joel Bernstein – acoustic guitar (2, 8), backing vocals (3), art direction, photography 
 John Brennan – rhythm guitar (2)
 Danny Kortchmar – rhythm guitar (2, 5), guitar solo (6), guitars (8, 10)
 Steve Lukather – lead guitar (2)
 Stephen Stills – rhythm guitar (5)
 Tim Drummond – bass (1-4, 6-8, 10), six-string bass (1, 10)
 George Perry – bass (5)
 Joe Vitale – drums (1, 5, 6, 10), percussion (1, 10), flute (1), organ (4), timpani (5), synthesizers (7), acoustic piano (7), string arrangements (7)
 Russ Kunkel – percussion (1-3), drums (2-4, 6-8)
 Joe Lala – percussion (5)
 Jackson Nash – harmonica (9)
 Wayne Goodwin – string arrangements (5, 9), orchestration (7), conductor (5, 7), string writing (9), string director (9)
 Glen Rosecrans – music preparation (5, 7, 9)
 Tim Barr – strings (5, 7)
 Debra Pearson – strings (5)
 Daniel Smith – strings (5, 7)
 Kevan Torfeh – strings (5, 7, 9)
 Deborah Yamak – strings (5, 7)
 Rhonni Hallman – strings (7)
 Jean Hugo – strings (7)
 Peter Kent – strings (7)
 Sid Page – strings (7, 9)
 Debra Price – strings (7)
 Julie Rosenfeld – strings (7)
 Carol Shive – strings (7)
 Vicki Sylvester – strings (7)
 Margaret Wooten – strings (7)
 Ruth Kahn – strings (9)
 Cece Bullard – backing vocals (1)
 Jackson Browne – backing vocals (2)
 David Crosby – backing vocals (2, 5), acoustic guitar (3)
 Armando Hurley – backing vocals (2)
 Nicolette Larson – backing vocals (2)
 Gloria Coleman – backing vocals (3, 4, 6, 8, 10)
 Brenda Eager – backing vocals (3, 4, 6, 8, 10)
 Cleo Kennedy – backing vocals (3, 4, 6, 8, 10)
 Leah Kunkel –  backing vocals (5)
 Stanley Johnston – producer, engineer 
 Howard Albert – engineer 
 Ron Albert – engineer 
 Steve Gursky – engineer 
 Jerry Hudgins – engineer 
 Wally Traugott – mastering 
 Margaret Holmes – lyric and credit collation 
 Gary Burden – art direction 
 Color Service, Inc. – artwork 
 Hartmann & Goodman – management

Charts

References

1980 albums
Graham Nash albums
Albums produced by Graham Nash
Capitol Records albums